Ruvimbo Hope Masike, professionally known as Hope Masike (born September 9, 1984) is a Zimbabwean musician and dancer. She is known as "The Princess of Mbira" and her music has its roots both in traditional and modern African culture. Hope is also the lead singer for Monoswezi. She initially studied Fine Art at Harare Polytechnic.

Biography 
Hope graduated from the Zimbabwe College of Music where she studied Ethnomusicology at Zimbabwe College of Music and later had a breakthrough in the music industry in 2008. Hope's music is influenced by African culture, including Francophone and Lusophone Africa. It is important to her to maintain African culture in music, but to also "update it" in order to keep it relevant to her audiences. She is known as "The Princess of Mbira."

Masike was the first winner in the Outstanding Female Musician category for the Zimbabwe National Arts Merit Awards (NAMA) in 2013. In 2016, she was again nominated in the category of Outstanding Female Musician for NAMA and was also nominated for Best Video for the KORA Awards. She was selected as a Onebeat Fellow in 2014. Hope was cast as the lead in a theatrical musical drama called Bongile which was adapted from a book of the same title written by Chiedza Makwara

Discography

Albums 

 Hope (2009)
Mbira, Love & Chocolate (2012)
 The Exorcism of a Spinster (Riverboat Records/ World Music Network, 2019)

Monoswezi Albums

 The Village (2013)
 Monoswezi Yenga (2015)
 A Je (2017)

Single 

 Kwira Gomo (2016)
 Ndinewe (Blah Ent, 2016)
 Idenga (Riverboat Records/ World Music Network, 2019)

Collaborations 

 Boombap Idiophonics with DJ Oil and The Monkey Nuts (2015)
Zenzele” with Mahube (2018)

Awards

References

External links 

Hope Masike on YouTube

21st-century Zimbabwean women singers
1984 births
Zimbabwean musicians
Living people